The governorates of Yemen are divided into 333 districts (as of 2019) ( mudīriyyā). The districts are subdivided into 2,210 Uzaal (sub-districts), and then into 38,284 villages (as of 2001). The districts are listed below, by governorate:

'Aden Governorate
Al Buraiqeh District
Al Mansura District
Al Mualla District
Ash Shaikh Outhman District
Attawahi District
Craiter District
Dar Sad District
Khur Maksar District

'Amran Governorate
Al Ashah District
Al Madan District
Al Qaflah District
Amran District
As Sawd District
As Sudah District
Bani Suraim District
Dhi Bin District
Habur Zulaymah District
Harf Sufyan District
Huth District
Iyal Surayh District
Jabal Iyal Yazid District
Khamir District
Kharif District
Maswar District
Raydah District
Shaharah District
Suwayr District
Thula District

Abyan Governorate
Ahwar District
Al Mahfad District
Al Wade'a District
Jayshan District
Khanfir District
Lawdar District
Mudiyah District
Rasad District
Sarar District
Sibah District
Zingibar District

Ad Dali' Governorate
Ad Dhale'e District
Al Azariq District
Al Husha District
Al Hussein District
Ash Shu'ayb District
Damt District
Jahaf District
Juban District
Qa'atabah District

Al Bayda' Governorate
Al A'rsh District
Al Bayda District
Al Bayda City District
Al Malagim District
Al Quraishyah District
Ar Ryashyyah District
As Sawadiyah District
As Sawma'ah District
Ash Sharyah District
At Taffah District
Az Zahir District
Dhi Na'im District
Maswarah District
Mukayras District
Na'man District
Nati' District
Rada' District
Radman Al Awad District
Sabah District
Wald Rabi' District

Al Hudaydah Governorate
Ad Dahi District
Ad Durayhimi District
Al Garrahi District
Al Hajjaylah District
Al Hali District
Al Hawak District
Al Khawkhah District
Al Mansuriyah District
Al Marawi'ah District
Al Mighlaf District
Al Mina District
Al Munirah District
Al Qanawis District
Alluheyah District
As Salif District
As Sukhnah District
At Tuhayat District
Az Zaydiyah District
Az Zuhrah District
Bajil District
Bayt al-Faqih District
Bura District
Hays District
Jabal Ra's District
Kamaran District 
Zabid District

Al Jawf Governorate
Al Ghayl District
Al Hazm District
Al Humaydat District
Al Khalq District
Al Maslub District
Al Matammah District
Al Maton District
Az Zahir District
Bart Al Anan District
Khabb wa ash Sha'af District
Kharab Al Marashi District
Rajuzah District

Al Mahrah Governorate
Al Ghaydah District
Al Masilah District
Hat District
Hawf District
Huswain District
Man'ar District
Qishn District 
Sayhut District
Shahan District

Al Mahwit Governorate
Al Khabt District
Al Mahwait District
Al Mahwait City District
Ar Rujum District
At Tawilah District
Bani Sa'd District
Hufash District
Milhan District
Shibam Kawkaban District

Amanat Al Asimah Governorate
Al Wahdah District
As Sabain District
Assafi'yah District
At Tahrir District
Ath'thaorah District
Az'zal District
Bani Al Harith District
Ma'ain District
Old City District
Shu'aub District

Dhamar Governorate
Al Hada District
Al Manar District
Anss District
Dawran Aness District
Dhamar City District
Jabal Ash sharq District
Jahran District 
Maghirib Ans District
Mayfa'at Anss District
Utmah District
Wusab Al Ali District
Wusab As Safil District

Hadhramaut Governorate
Ad Dis District
Adh Dhlia'ah District
Al Abr District
Mukalla District
Mukalla City District
Al Qaf District
Al Qatn District
Amd District
Ar Raydah Wa Qusayar District
As Sawm District
Ash Shihr District
Brom Mayfa District
Daw'an District
Ghayl Ba Wazir District
Ghayl Bin Yamin District
Hagr As Sai'ar District
Hajr District
Hawrah District
Huraidhah District
Rakhyah District
Rumah District
Sah District
Sayun District
Shibam District
Tarim District
Thamud District
Yabuth District
Zamakh wa Manwakh District

Hajjah Governorate
Abs District
Aflah Al Yaman District
Aflah Ash Shawm District
Al Jamimah District
Al Maghrabah District
Al Mahabishah District
Al Miftah District
Ash Shaghadirah District
Ash Shahil District
Aslem District
Bakil Al Mir District
Bani Al Awam District
Bani Qa'is District
Hajjah District
Hajjah City District
Harad District
Hayran District
Khayran Al Muharraq District
Ku'aydinah District
Kuhlan Affar District
Kuhlan Ash Sharaf District
Kushar District
Mabyan District
Midi District
Mustaba District
Najrah District
Qafl Shamer District
Qarah District
Sharas District
Wadhrah District
Washhah District

Ibb Governorate
Al Dhihar District
Al Makhadir District
Al Mashannah District
Al Qafr District
Al Udayn District
An Nadirah District
Ar Radmah District
As Sabrah District
As Saddah District
As Sayyani District
Ash Sha'ir District
Ba'dan District
Dhi As Sufal District
Far Al Udayn District
Hazm Al Udayn District
Hubaysh District
Ibb District
Jiblah District
Mudhaykhirah District
Yarim District

Lahij Governorate
Al  Hawtah District
Al Had District
Al Madaribah Wa Al Arah District
Al Maflahy District
Al Maqatirah District
Al Milah District
Al Musaymir District
Al Qabbaytah District
Habil Jabr District
Halimayn District
Radfan District
Tuban District
Tur Al Bahah District
Yafa'a District
Yahr District

Ma'rib Governorate
Al Abdiyah District
Al Jubah District
Bidbadah District
Harib District
Harib Al Qaramish District
Jabal Murad District
Mahliyah District
Majzar District
Marib District
Marib City District
Medghal District
Raghwan District
Rahabah District
Sirwah District

Raymah Governorate
Al Jabin District
Al Jafariyah District
As Salafiyah District
Bilad At Ta'am District
Kusmah District
Mazhar District

Sa'dah Governorate
Al Dhaher District
Al Hashwah District
As Safra District
Baqim District
Ghamr District
Haydan District
Kitaf wa Al Boqe'e District
Majz District
Monabbih District
Qatabir District
Razih District
Sa'adah District
Sahar District
Saqayn District
Shada'a District

Sana'a Governorate
Al Haymah Ad Dakhiliyah District
Al Haymah Al Kharijiyah District
Al Husn District
Arhab District
Attyal District
Bani Dhabyan District
Bani Hushaysh District
Bani Matar District
Bilad Ar Rus District
Hamdan District
Jihanah District
Khwlan District
Manakhah District
Nihm District
Sa'fan District
Sanhan District

Shabwah Governorate
Ain District
Al Talh District
Ar Rawdah District
Arma District
As Said District
Ataq District
Bayhan District
Dhar District
Habban District
Hatib District
Jardan District
Mayfa'a District
Merkhah Al Ulya District
Merkhah As Sufla District
Nisab District
Rudum District
Usaylan District

Socotra Governorate
Hidaybu District (eastern part of Socotra Island)
Qulensya Wa Abd Al Kuri District (western part of Socotra Island, Abd al Kuri Island, others)

Ta'izz Governorate
Al  Makha District
Al Ma'afer District
Al Mawasit District
Al Misrakh District
Al Mudhaffar District
Al Qahirah District
Al Wazi'iyah District
As Silw District
Ash Shamayatayn District
At Ta'iziyah District
Dhubab District
Dimnat Khadir District
Hayfan District
Jabal Habashy District
Maqbanah District
Mashra'a Wa Hadnan District
Mawiyah District
Mawza District
Sabir Al Mawadim District
Salh District
Same'a District
Shara'b Ar Rawnah District
Shara'b As Salam District

External links
 Statoids
 Interactive map of Yemeni districts via Google My Maps

Districts
Yemen, Districts
Yemen 2
Districts, Yemen
Districts